Konstantinos Petrou Kavafis (April 29 (April 17, OS), 1863 – April 29, 1933), known, especially in English, as Constantine P. Cavafy and often published as C. P. Cavafy, was a Greek poet, journalist, and civil servant from Alexandria. His work, as one translator put it, "holds the historical and the erotic in a single embrace."

Cavafy's friend E. M. Forster,  the novelist and literary critic, introduced his poems to the English-speaking world in 1923, famously describing him as "a Greek gentleman in a straw hat, standing absolutely motionless at a slight angle to the universe."  Cavafy's consciously individual style earned him a place among the most important figures not only in Greek poetry, but in Western poetry as a whole.

Cavafy wrote 155 poems, while dozens more remained incomplete or in sketch form. During his lifetime, he consistently refused to formally publish his work and preferred to share it through local newspapers and magazines, or even print it out himself and give it away to anyone interested. His most important poems were written after his fortieth birthday, and officially published two years after his death.

Biography

Cavafy was born in 1863 in Alexandria, Egypt, to Greek parents who originated from the Greek community of Constantinople (now Istanbul), and was baptized into the Greek Orthodox Church. His father was a prosperous importer-exporter who had lived in England in earlier years and acquired British nationality. After his father died in 1870, Cavafy and his family settled for a while in Liverpool. In 1876, his family faced financial problems due to the Long Depression of 1873, so, by 1877, they had to move back to Alexandria.

In 1882, disturbances in Alexandria caused the family to move again, though temporarily, to Constantinople. This was the year when a revolt broke out in Alexandria against the Anglo-French control of Egypt, thus precipitating the 1882 Anglo-Egyptian War. Alexandria was bombarded by a British fleet, and the family apartment at Ramleh was burned.

In 1885, Cavafy returned to Alexandria, where he lived for the rest of his life. His first work was as a journalist; then he took a position with the British-run Egyptian Ministry of Public Works for thirty years. (Egypt was a British protectorate until 1926.) He published his poetry from 1891 to 1904 in the form of broadsheets, and only for his close friends. Any acclaim he was to receive came mainly from within the Greek community of Alexandria. Eventually, in 1903, he was introduced to mainland-Greek literary circles through a favourable review by Gregorios Xenopoulos. He received little recognition because his style differed markedly from the then-mainstream Greek poetry. It was only twenty years later, after the Greek defeat in the Greco-Turkish War (1919–1922), that a new generation of almost nihilist poets (e.g. Karyotakis) found inspiration in Cavafy's work.

A biographical note written by Cavafy reads as follows:

He died of cancer of the larynx on April 29, 1933, his 70th birthday. Since his death, Cavafy's reputation has grown. His poetry is taught in school in Greece and Cyprus, and in universities around the world.

E. M. Forster knew him personally and wrote a memoir of him, contained in his book Alexandria. Forster, Arnold J. Toynbee, and T. S. Eliot were among the earliest promoters of Cavafy in the English-speaking world before the Second World War.  In 1966, David Hockney made a series of prints to illustrate a selection of Cavafy's poems, including In the dull village.

Work

Cavafy was instrumental in the revival and recognition of Greek poetry both at home and abroad. His poems are, typically, concise but intimate evocations of real or literary figures and milieux that have played roles in Greek culture. Uncertainty about the future, sensual pleasures, the moral character and psychology of individuals, homosexuality, and a fatalistic existential nostalgia are some of the defining themes.

Besides his subjects, unconventional for the time, his poems also exhibit a skilled and versatile craftsmanship, which is extremely difficult to translate. Cavafy was a perfectionist, obsessively refining every single line of his poetry. His mature style was a free iambic form, free in the sense that verses rarely rhyme and are usually from 10 to 17 syllables. In his poems, the presence of rhyme usually implies irony.

Cavafy drew his themes from personal experience, along with a deep and wide knowledge of history, especially of the Hellenistic era. Many of his poems are pseudo-historical, or seemingly historical, or accurately but quirkily historical.

One of Cavafy's most important works is his 1904 poem "Waiting for the Barbarians". The poem begins by describing a city-state in decline, whose population and legislators are waiting for the arrival of the barbarians. When night falls, the barbarians have not arrived. The poem ends: "What is to become of us without barbarians? Those people were a solution of a sort." The poem heavily influenced books like The Tartar Steppe, Waiting for the Barbarians (Coetzee), and The Opposing Shore.

In 1911, Cavafy wrote "Ithaca", inspired by the Homeric return journey of Odysseus to his home island, as depicted in the Odyssey. The poem's theme is the destination which produces the journey of life: "Keep Ithaca always in your mind. / Arriving there is what you’re destined for". The traveller should set out with hope, and at the end you may find Ithaca has no more riches to give you, but "Ithaca gave you the marvelous journey".

Almost all of Cavafy's work was in Greek; yet, his poetry remained unrecognized and underestimated in Greece, until after the publication of the first anthology in 1935 by Heracles Apostolidis (father of Renos Apostolidis). His unique style and language (which was a mixture of Katharevousa and Demotic Greek) had attracted the criticism  of Kostis Palamas, the greatest poet of his era in mainland Greece, and his followers, who were in favour of the simplest form of Demotic Greek.

He is known for his prosaic use of metaphors, his brilliant use of historical imagery, and his aesthetic perfectionism. These attributes, amongst others, have assured him an enduring place in the literary pantheon of the Western World.

Historical poems
Cavafy wrote over a dozen historical poems about famous historical figures and regular people.  He was mainly inspired by the Hellenistic era with Alexandria at primary focus. Other poems originate from Helleno-romaic antiquity and the Byzantine era. Mythological references are also present. The periods chosen are mostly of decline and decadence (e.g. Trojans); his heroes facing the final end. His historical poems include: "The Glory of the Ptolemies", "In Sparta", "Come, O King of Lacedaemonians", "The First Step", "In the Year 200 B.C.", "If Only They Had Seen to It", "The Displeasure of Seleucid", "Theodotus", "Alexandrian Kings", "In Alexandria, 31 B.C.", "The God Forsakes Antony", "In a Township of Asia Minor", "Caesarion", "The Potentate from Western Libya", "Of the Hebrews (A.D. 50)", "Tomb of Eurion", "Tomb of Lanes", "Myres: Alexandrian A.D. 340", "Perilous Things", "From the School of the Renowned Philosopher", "A Priest of the Serapeum", "Kleitos Illness", "If Dead Indeed", "In the Month of Athyr", "Tomb of Ignatius", "From Ammones Who Died Aged 29 in 610", "Aemilianus Monae", "Alexandrian, A.D. 628-655", "In Church", "Morning Sea" (a few poems about Alexandria were left unfinished due to his death).

Homoerotic poems

Cavafy's sensual poems are filled with the lyricism and emotion of same-sex love, inspired by recollection and remembrance. The past and former actions, sometimes along with the vision for the future underlie the muse of Cavafy in writing these poems.  As poet George Kalogeris observes:
He is perhaps most popular today for his erotic verse, in which the Alexandrian youth[s] in his poems seem to have stepped right out of the Greek Anthology, and into a less accepting world that makes them vulnerable, and often keeps them in poverty, though the same Hellenic amber immures their beautiful bodies.  The subjects of his poems often have a provocative glamour to them even in barest outline: the homoerotic one night stand that is remembered for a lifetime, the oracular pronouncement unheeded, the talented youth prone to self destruction, the offhand remark that indicates a crack in the imperial façade.

Philosophical poems
Also called instructive poems, they are divided into poems with consultations to poets, and poems that deal with other situations such as isolation (for example, "The walls"), duty (for example, "Thermopylae"), and human dignity (for example, "The God Abandons Antony").

The poem "Thermopylae" reminds us of the famous battle of Thermopylae where the 300 Spartans and their allies fought against the greater numbers of Persians, although they knew that they would be defeated. There are some principles in our lives that we should live by, and Thermopylae is the ground of duty. We stay there fighting although we know that there is the potential for failure. (At the end the traitor Ephialtes will appear, leading the Persians through the secret trail).

In another poem, "In the Year 200 B.C.", he comments on the historical epigram “Alexander, son of Philip, and the Greeks, except of Lacedaemonians,...”, from the donation of Alexander to Athens after the Battle of the Granicus. Cavafy praises the Hellenistic era and idea, so condemning the closed-mind and localistic ideas about Hellenism. However, in other poems, his stance displays ambiguity between the Classical ideal and the Hellenistic era (which is sometimes described with a tone of decadence).

Another poem is the Epitaph of a Greek trader from Samos who was sold into slavery in India and dies on the shores of the Ganges: regretting the greed for riches which led him to sail so far away and end up "among utter barbarians", expressing his deep longing for his homeland and his wish to die as "In Hades I would be surrounded by Greeks".

Museum

Cavafy's Alexandria apartment has since been converted into a museum. The museum holds several of Cavafy's sketches and original manuscripts as well as containing several pictures and portraits of and by Cavafy.

Bibliography
Selections of Cavafy's poems appeared only in pamphlets, privately printed booklets and broadsheets during his lifetime. The first publication in book form was "Ποιήματα" (Poiēmata, "Poems"), published posthumously in Alexandria, 1935.

Volumes with translations of Cavafy's poetry in English
 Poems by C. P. Cavafy, translated by John Mavrogordato (London: Chatto & Windus, 1978, first edition in 1951)
 The Complete Poems of Cavafy, translated by Rae Dalven, introduction by W. H. Auden (New York: Harcourt, Brace & World, 1961)
 The Greek Poems of C.P. Cavafy As Translated by Memas Kolaitis, two volumes (New York: Aristide D. Caratzas, Publisher, 1989)
 Complete Poems by C P Cavafy, translated by Daniel Mendelsohn, (Harper Press, 2013)
Passions and Ancient Days - 21 New Poems, Selected and translated by Edmund Keeley and George Savidis (London: The Hogarth Press, 1972)
 Poems by Constantine Cavafy, translated by George Khairallah (Beirut: privately printed, 1979)
 C. P. Cavafy, Collected Poems, translated by Edmund Keeley and Philip Sherrard, edited by George Savidis, Revised edition (Princeton, NJ: Princeton University Press, 1992)
 Selected Poems of C. P. Cavafy, translated by Desmond O'Grady (Dublin: Dedalus, 1998)
 Before Time Could Change Them: The Complete Poems of Constantine P. Cavafy, translated by Theoharis C. Theoharis, foreword by Gore Vidal (New York: Harcourt, 2001)
 Poems by C. P. Cavafy, translated by J.C. Cavafy (Athens: Ikaros, 2003)
 I've Gazed So Much by C. P. Cavafy, translated by George Economou (London: Stop Press, 2003)
 C. P. Cavafy, The Canon, translated by Stratis Haviaras, foreword by Seamus Heaney (Athens: Hermes Publishing, 2004)
 The Collected Poems, translated by Evangelos Sachperoglou, edited by Anthony Hirst and with an introduction by Peter Mackridge (Oxford: Oxford University Press,  2007)
 The Collected Poems of C. P. Cavafy: A New Translation, translated by Aliki Barnstone, Introduction by Gerald Stern (New York: W.W. Norton, 2007)
 C. P. Cavafy, Selected Poems, translated with an introduction by Avi Sharon (Harmondsworth: Penguin, 2008)
 Cavafy: 166 Poems, translated by Alan L Boegehold (Axios Press,  2008)
 C. P. Cavafy, Collected Poems, translated by Daniel Mendelsohn (New York: Alfred A. Knopf, 2009)
C. P. Cavafy, Poems: The Canon, translated by John Chioles, edited by Dimitrios Yatromanolakis (Cambridge, Massachusetts: Harvard Early Modern and Modern Greek Library, 2011)
 "C.P. Cavafy, Selected Poems", translated by David Connolly, Aiora Press, Athens 2013
  Clearing the Ground: C.P. Cavafy, Poetry and Prose, 1902-1911, translations and essay by Martin McKinsey (Chapel Hill: Laertes, 2015) 
Translations of Cavafy's poems are also included in
 Lawrence Durrell, Justine (London, UK: Faber & Faber, 1957)
 Modern Greek Poetry, edited by Kimon Friar (New York: Simon and Schuster, 1973)
 Memas Kolaitis, Cavafy as I knew him (Santa Barbara, CA: Kolaitis Dictionaries, 1980)
 James Merrill, Collected Poems (New York: Alfred A. Knopf, 2002)
 David Ferry, Bewilderment (Chicago: University of Chicago Press, 2012)
 Don Paterson, Landing Light (London, UK: Faber & Faber, 2003)
 Derek Mahon, Adaptations (Loughcrew, Ireland: The Gallery Press, 2006)
 A.E. Stallings, Hapax (Evanston, Illinois: Triquarterly Books, 2006)
 Don Paterson, Rain (London, UK: Faber & Faber, 2009)
 John Ash, In the Wake of the Day (Manchester, UK: Carcanet Press, 2010)
 David Harsent, Night (London, UK: Faber & Faber, 2011)
 Selected Prose Works, C.P. Cavafy, edited and translated by Peter Jeffreys (Ann Arbor: University of Michigan Press, 2010)

Other works
 Panagiotis Roilos, C. P. Cavafy: The Economics of Metonymy, Urbana: University of Illinois Press, 2009. 
 Panagiotis Roilos (ed.), Imagination and Logos: Essays on C. P. Cavafy, Cambridge, Massachusetts, Harvard University Press, 2010.
 Robert Liddell, Cavafy: A Critical Biography (London: Duckworth, 1974). A widely acclaimed biography of Cavafy. This biography has also been translated in Greek (Ikaros, 1980) and Spanish (Ediciones Paidos Iberica, 2004).
 P. Bien, Constantine Cavafy (1964)
 Edmund Keeley, Cavafy's Alexandria (Princeton, NJ: Princeton University Press, 1995). An extensive analysis of Cavafy's works.
 Michael Haag, Alexandria: City of Memory (New Haven, CT: Yale University Press, 2005). Provides a portrait of the city during the first half of the 20th century and a biographical account of Cavafy and his influence on E. M. Forster and Lawrence Durrell.
 Michael Haag, Vintage Alexandria: Photographs of the City 1860–1960 (New York and Cairo: The American University in Cairo Press, 2008).  A photographic record of the cosmopolitan city as it was known to Cavafy.  It includes photographs of Cavafy, E. M. Forster, Lawrence Durrell, and people they knew in Alexandria.
 Martin McKinsey, Hellenism and the Postcolonial Imagination: Yeats, Cavafy, Walcott (Madison, NJ: Fairleigh Dickinson University Press, 2010).  First book to approach Cavafy's work from a postcolonial perspective.

Filmography
 Cavafy, a biographical film was directed by Iannis Smaragdis in 1996 with music by Vangelis. A literary form of the script of the film was also published in book form by Smaragdis.

Other references
 C. P. Cavafy appears as a character in the Alexandria Quartet of Lawrence Durrell.
 The Weddings Parties Anything song "The Afternoon Sun" is based on the Cavafy poem of the same title.
 The American poet Mark Doty's book My Alexandria uses the place and imagery of Cavafy to create a comparable contemporary landscape.
 The Canadian poet and singer-songwriter Leonard Cohen transformed Cavafy's poem "The God Abandons Antony", based on Mark Antony's loss of the city of Alexandria and his empire, into "Alexandra Leaving", a song around lost love.
 Scottish songwriter Donovan featured one of Cavafy's poems in his 1970 film There is an Ocean.
 The Nobel Prize-winning Turkish novelist Orhan Pamuk, in an extended essay published in The New York Times, writes about how Cavafy's poetry, particularly his poem "The City", has changed the way Pamuk looks at, and thinks about, the city of Istanbul, a city that remains central to Pamuk's own writing.
 Frank H. T. Rhodes' last commencement speech given at Cornell University in 1995 was based on Cavafy's poem "Ithaca".
 Greek director Stelios Haralambopoulos's documentary The Night Fernando Pessoa Met Constantine Cavafy imagined Cavafy met with Portuguese poet Fernando Pessoa on a transatlantic ocean liner.

References

External links

 C. P. Cavafy - The official website of the Cavafy Archive (in English)
 "The official website of the Cavafy Archive" (in Greek)
 A comprehensive website, including a biography, a gallery, bibliography, news and extensive selections of poetry in English and Greek
 Cavafy in English and Greek, Select Online Resources
 Audio introduction to Cavafy's poems In English, with examination of ten of his finest poems
 The Cavafy Museum in Alexandria
 Cavafy: surviving immortality
 "Artificial Flowers"—translations by Peter J. King & Andrea Christofidou
 Extensive collection of poems, in English & Greek & audio
 Ithaki.net A search engine named in honor of the poem "Ithaki"
 'As Good as Great Poetry Gets' Daniel Mendelsohn article on Cavafy from The New York Review of Books
 "Of the Jews (A.D. 50)" by C. P. Cavafy
 Audio: Cavafy's poem Ithaka read by Edmund Keeley
 "In the dull village", a painting by David Hockney inspired by Cavafy, now in the British Museum
 Babis Koulouras recites Cavafy's poems by heart. The orchestra of "K.P.Kavafis" team of Culture Club of Ano Syros plays Cavafy's songs (in Greek)
 
 

 
1863 births
1933 deaths
British people of Greek descent
Egyptian people of Greek descent
Writers from Alexandria
Modern Greek poets
Greek journalists
19th-century Greek poets
20th-century Greek poets
Bisexual men
Greek LGBT poets
Egyptian journalists
Greek LGBT journalists
Greek bisexual people
19th-century Egyptian poets
Egyptian LGBT people
20th-century Egyptian poets
Egyptian male poets
Bisexual poets
19th-century male writers
20th-century Greek male writers
Deaths from laryngeal cancer
Greeks from the Ottoman Empire
Greek Orthodox Christians from Egypt
LGBT Eastern Orthodox Christians
Poets from Liverpool
19th-century Greek LGBT people
20th-century Greek LGBT people